Creative Korea Party (CKP) was a political party of South Korea. It was formed out of the Uri Party and its resulting civil splinter groups, with their leader Moon Kook-hyun, a well-known former business leader who recently started his political career. Their 2007 presidential bid was unsuccessful, however, they gained 3 seats at the 2008 general election on April 9, 2008, including the election of Moon Kook-hyun at Eunpyeong-eul, Seoul district; but lost all of these seats in the subsequent 2012 general election. They were deregistered on 26 April 2012.

Party platform
 Creating a new Social Solidarity
 Establishing a Knowledge and Creativity-based Economy
 Minimizing military tension of Korean Peninsula
 Providing 'Productive Welfare'
 Building a sustainable Social development
 Funding a Substantial Public and Lifelong Education
 Respecting Minority Rights
 Taking responsibility of the Diversity of Cultural References
 Creating Economic Cooperation in Northeast Asia

Notable members
 Moon Kook-hyun MP, Party Leader, Official Presidential candidate of the party and MP for Eunpyeong-gu 2nd electorate, Seoul
 Lee Yong-kyeong MP, former CEO of KT and Korean National Assembly MP
 Yu Won-il MP, former environmental movement organizer in Siheung, Gyeonggi Province, and Korean National Assembly MP
 Lee Jeong-ja, Chairperson of Green-consumer Network (Civil organization)

2007 Election
They held their nominating convention for 2007 presidential election on November 4, 2007. During that event, its leader Moon Kook-hyun was elected with 8,884(94.9%) of the mobile phone  vote. As one of the pro-governmental liberal candidates, he and his party suffered the pressure of political simplification from several civil organizational leaders for the entire campaigning period. However, although negotiating with the UNDP politicians a lot, he eventually decided to target voters disappointed with both major parties (the UNDP and GNP) and their candidates(Chung Dong-young and Lee Myung-bak). They hoped to reach somewhat over 10% support, but gained a final result of 1.38 million voters(5.82%) which put them in 4th place. However, they earned more votes than the 10-year-old KDLP's result(3.00%), and gained strong supports (Its average was roughly 8%) from metropolitan city areas, such as Seoul and its suburbs, Incheon, Daejeon, Chuncheon, Jeju, therefore it was judged to be a potential threat to major parties during the 2008 parliamentary election.

2012 election 
In the 2012 general election, the party received less than .1% of the constituency votes, and .4% of the national votes for proportional representation. It lost all three seats in the parliament. The party was dissolved as a result (The party needs to obtain at least 2% of the national votes in order for it to remain registered).

Electoral results

President

Legislature

See also
Politics of South Korea
Lists of political parties

References

Defunct political parties in South Korea
Liberal parties in South Korea
Political parties established in 2007
Political parties disestablished in 2012
2007 establishments in South Korea
2012 disestablishments in South Korea